Dear Dotty is a British television sitcom that aired on the BBC in 1954. Starring Avril Angers, Naomi Chance, and Jack Melford, the series consisted of six 30-minute episodes. All six episodes are believed to be lost.

References

External links
 

1950s British sitcoms
1954 British television series debuts
1954 British television series endings
BBC television sitcoms
Black-and-white British television shows
British live television series
English-language television shows
Lost television shows